Morena Gallizio married Tescari (born 18 January 1974) is an Italian former alpine skier.

She is married to former alpine skier Fabrizio Tescari.

Career
She competed in the 1992 Winter Olympics, 1994 Winter Olympics, and 1998 Winter Olympics.

National titles
Gallizio-Tescari has won three national championships at individual senior level.

Italian Alpine Ski Championships
Slalom: 1995
Combined: 1995, 1997

References

External links
 
 

1974 births
Living people
Italian female alpine skiers
Olympic alpine skiers of Italy
Alpine skiers at the 1992 Winter Olympics
Alpine skiers at the 1994 Winter Olympics
Alpine skiers at the 1998 Winter Olympics
Alpine skiers of Gruppo Sportivo Forestale